Harm van Houten  (1892, Boksum, Friesland - 1952) was a Dutch politician.

See also
List of Dutch politicians

1892 births
1952 deaths
People from Menaldumadeel
Anti-Revolutionary Party politicians
Christian Democratic Union (Netherlands) politicians